Lykourgos Kallergis (7 March 1914 – 27 August 2011) was a Greek actor, director and politician.

Life
Kallergis was born on 7 March 1914 in Choumeri, Mylopotamos to his father, Stavros Kallergis. He moved to Athens at age 10. Kallergis was married twice, to Jenny Kollarou and Maria Foka (I). 

Kallergis was credited in more than five hundred acting roles in Greek television, film, radio and stage over a career that spanned more than sixty years. He also ventured into politics, serving as a deputy within the Greek Communist Party from 1977 until 1981. Kallergis later translated foreign language plays into Greek and worked as a director.

Lykourgos Kallergis died at the Giorgos Gennimatas hospital in Athens on 27 August 2011, at the age of 97.

Filmography

References

External links

1914 births
2011 deaths
Greek male stage actors
Greek male film actors
Greek male television actors
Greek male radio actors
Members of the Hellenic Parliament
Greek MPs 1977–1981
Communist Party of Greece politicians
People from Geropotamos
Male actors from Athens